Pteri is a village in Achaea, Greece. Pteri is part of the municipal unit of Aigio and had a population of 466 (4 for the village proper) in 2011.

Population

See also
List of settlements in Achaea
Konstantinos Gofas

References

External links
Pteri on GTP Travel Pages

Aigialeia
Aigio
Populated places in Achaea